Kampong Burong Pingai Berakas is a village in Brunei-Muara District, Brunei, and a neighbourhood in the capital Bandar Seri Begawan. The population was 564 in 2016. It is one of the villages within Mukim Berakas 'A'. The postcode is BB3313.

References 

Neighbourhoods in Bandar Seri Begawan
Villages in Brunei-Muara District